Joe B. Foster (July 25, 1934 - May 9, 2020) is an American businessman, oilman and philanthropist from Texas. From 1989 to 2005, Foster was Chairman, President, and Chief Executive Officer of Newfield Exploration Company, headquartered in Houston. Previously, Foster was Chairman of Tenneco Oil Company and Executive Vice President and director of its parent, Tenneco Inc. He was with Tenneco for 31 years and also served as Chairman of the Tenneco Gas Pipeline Group.

Foster was born in Arp, Texas and attended Texas A&M University. He graduated in 1957 with a Bachelor of Science degree in petroleum engineering and a Bachelor of Business Administration degree in general business. In May 1997, he was named a Distinguished Alumnus of Texas A&M University. Foster served as Chairman of the National Petroleum Council, an industry advisory body to the U.S. Secretary of Energy, and in 1995–1996 served as Chairman of the Offshore Committee of the Independent Petroleum Association of America. He was a Director of Memorial Hermann Hospital System and has served as Chairman of the Houston Museum of Natural Science, the Greater Houston YMCA, and the Texas A&M Development Foundation. He also served on the Boards of Baker Hughes Incorporated and New Jersey Resources Corporation. Foster was chairman and a senior advisor at Tudor, Pickering, and Holt 2008–2016.

Career 
In addition to his tenures at Newfield and Tenneco, Joe Foster's corporate directorships include Baker Hughes, Inc., McDermott International, Inc., New Jersey Resources Corporation, Valero Energy, Dual Drilling, and Targa Resources, Inc. From February through August 2000, Foster served as interim chairman, president and chief executive officer of Baker Hughes Incorporated, while the company searched for a new chief executive. In 2001–2002, Foster served as the Independent Trustee for a large portion of Texaco's refining and marketing assets which were required to be divested in the course of the Chevron-Texaco merger.

Tenneco Oil 

Foster was chairman of Tenneco Oil Company and executive vice president and director of its parent, Tenneco Inc. He began with Tenneco as a Junior Petroleum Engineer in Oklahoma City in 1957. After serving in several engineering positions in Lafayette, Louisiana while Tenneco was establishing its Gulf of Mexico operations, he became Chief of Planning and Economic Analysis for Tenneco Oil Exploration and Production in Houston in 1968. He rose through the ranks of Tenneco Oil becoming its president in 1978. In 1981, he was named to the Board of Directors of Tenneco Inc. and assumed corporate level responsibility for all of Tenneco Inc.’s upstream, downstream, and gas pipeline businesses. He left Tenneco when its board elected to divest Tenneco Oil in 1988.

Newfield Exploration 

Joe B. Foster is the founder of Newfield Exploration Company, a Houston-based oil and gas exploration company. He served as chief executive officer until his retirement from active management in January 2000, and remained as chairman of its board until May 2005. Foster founded Newfield in 1989 as a private start-up with $9 million of equity capital provided by himself, other employees, a group of Houston investors, and University of Texas Endowment funds. It became a public company in 1993, and its recent market value was about $5 billion.

Tudor, Pickering, & Holt 

Foster currently affiliated with the Tudor, Pickering, Holt & Co. investment banking firm, serving as Chairman of its TPH Partners private equity Fund I, and as a Senior Advisor to its Fund II. In addition, he participates as a non-operating partner in drilling oil and gas wells in the Gulf Coast area.

Philanthropy 
He has served on several not-for-profit boards of directors, including the Houston Museum of Natural Science, Memorial Hermann Healthcare System, Houston Hospice, and the YMCA of Greater Houston. He has also served as Chairman of Houston A+ Challenge, (formerly Houston Annenberg Challenge), an organization directed at improving public schools in the Houston area.

Community service 
 Chairman, Greater Houston YMCA, 1989–91
 Chairman, Houston Museum of Natural Science, 1991
 Chairman, Houston A+ Challenge, 2009-10
 Director, Memorial Hermann Healthcare System, 1999–2006
 Director, Houston Hospice
 Texas A&M Foundation, Trustee, 1988–96; Chairman, 1993

Awards and recognition 
Foster was named "Entrepreneur of the Year" in Houston's Energy Sector in 1994 and an "All American Wildcatter" in 1995. In 2004, he was named a Gulf of Mexico "Industry Pioneer" by the Offshore Energy Center in Galveston, Texas, and has been named the Houston World Affairs Council's 2006 Jones International Citizen of the Year.

Awards received 
 Houston Entrepreneur of the Year, Energy Sector, 1994 
 Distinguished Alumnus, Texas A&M, 1997
 Spindletop Service Award, 2000
 Mays College of Business, Outstanding Alumnus, 2001
 Joe B. Foster Chair in Business Leadership, Mays Business School, 2004
 Texas Business Hall of Fame, 2006

References

Sources

External links 
 Newfield Exploration Official Site
 The Joe and Harriet Foster Family YMCA
 Joe B. Foster Texas Aggie Profile Page

Interviews 
 
 

1934 births
2020 deaths
American chief executives
20th-century American inventors
American chairpersons of corporations
Businesspeople from Houston
People from Arp, Texas
Texas A&M University alumni
20th-century American businesspeople
21st-century American businesspeople